An SX Phoenicis variable is a type of variable star. These stars exhibit a short period pulsation behavior that varies on time scales of 0.03–0.08 days (0.7–1.9 hours). They have spectral classifications in the range A2-F5 and vary in magnitude by up to 0.7. Compared to the Sun, these stars have a lower metallicity, which means they have a reduced abundance of elements other than hydrogen and helium. They also have relatively high space velocity and low luminosities for stars of their stellar classification. These properties distinguish the SX Phoenicis variables from their cousins, the Delta Scuti variables. The latter have longer periods, higher metallicity and large amplitudes.

SX Phoenicis variables are found primarily in globular clusters and galactic halos. The variability cycle has a period-luminosity relation. All known SX Phoenicis variables in globular clusters are blue straggler stars. These are stars that appear more blue (having a higher temperature) than the main sequence stars in the same cluster that have similar luminosities.

List
The following list contains selected SX Phoenicis variable that are of interest to amateur or professional astronomy. Unless otherwise noted, the given magnitudes are in the V-band.

Notes

References 
 

Variable stars
Blue stragglers